The 2016 San Jose Earthquakes season is the club's 34th year of existence, their 19th season in Major League Soccer and their 9th consecutive season in the top-flight of American soccer.

Background

Club

Current roster 

As of March 7, 2016.

Non-competitive

Arizona friendlies

Las Vegas friendly

California friendlies

Competitive

Major League Soccer

Standings 

Western Conference Table

Overall Table

Results

U.S. Open Cup

References 

San Jose Earthquakes
San Jose Earthquakes seasons
San Jose Earthquakes
San Jose Earthquakes